Deepak Paramesh is an Indian actor, who has appeared in Tamil language films.

Career 
Deepak regularly worked on short films and was closely associated with Karthik Subbaraj, eventually featuring in two anthology films released by the director, Bench Talkies - The First Bench (2015) and Aviyal (2016). Deepak's first film as a lead actor, the horror drama Unakkenna Venum Sollu (2015), garnered mixed reviews and went unnoticed at the box office. Away from films, Deepak gained a fan following through his impersonations on Dubsmash, where he produced videos impersonating Kamal Haasan. and Superstar Rajinikanth

In 2018, he appeared in a leading role in Karthik Subbaraj's silent thriller Mercury as one of the four youngsters who become stuck in a remote village. Following the successful collaboration, Karthik Subbaraj signed him on to star in Petta (2019), a big-budget film starring Rajinikanth. He will also next be seen in a thriller film titled Redrum alongside [[Ashok Selvan]
He also signed up for two more films with Director Karthik Subbaraj acting alongside Dhanush in Jagame Thandhiram which released directly on Netflix in 2020 followed by Mahaan starring CHIYAAN Vikram which also had a direct premiere on Amazon Prime in 2021. ].

Filmography

References

External links 

Living people
Male actors in Tamil cinema
Indian male film actors
21st-century Indian male actors
1988 births